The Jajpur derailment was a passenger train derailment that occurred at 19:45 local time (14:15 UTC) near Jajpur in the eastern state of Odisha, India, on 13 February 2009. Nine people were killed and 150 people were injured in the incident. Twelve carriages belonging to the Howrah–Chennai Coromandel Express are believed to have derailed following the train's departure from Jajapur Road station near Jajapur. The cause of the accident is currently unknown.

Derailment 
Following initial reports that the death toll was 10, two relief trains were dispatched to the scene. Eyewitnesses feared passengers were trapped in two of the derailed carriages. Medical and rescue teams from the Bhubaneswar headquarters of East Coast Railway converged on the scene of the accident and erected emergency lighting to speed up the rescue effort, which had been hampered by the dark. Local people assisted the emergency services in their rescue effort, with one local describing the accident as "horrible and serious". Union Minister of State for Railways R. Velu reached the spot on Saturday morning to take stock of the situation. A high-level inquiry had been ordered to ascertain the cause of the accident, he said.

Some coaches of the train were lying over each other and many people were trapped under the mangled train cars. The injured were sent to local hospitals.

Reaction 
The Minister said the Railways would pay Rs.500,000 each to the next of kin of those killed in the accident and a job each to the family of those killed.

Apart from providing free medical treatment, the Railways will pay Rs.50,000 each to those seriously injured and Rs.10,000 to other injured passengers.

See also 
List of Indian rail accidents
2009 Slovak coach and train collision

References 

2009 in India
Railway accidents in 2009
Derailments in India
Rail transport in Odisha
2000s in Orissa
Disasters in Odisha
February 2009 events in India
2009 disasters in India